Lucky is the second Korean solo mini album of Kim Hyun-joong of South Korean boy band SS501. It was released on 11 October 2011 under KeyEast Entertainment. A Limited Edition was released on 14 November 2011. The album was released in Taiwan on 18 November 2011, by Warner Music Taiwan.

The album peaked at number one on Gaon Album Chart for the week starting on 9 June 2011 and debut at number five on Billboard's World Chart for the week of 29 October 2011. It also top the import albums category in Japan's Oricon weekly chart.

Kim promoted the album by performing the title track "Lucky Guy", for which he released a music video, and "Do You Like That".

Track listing

Release history

Charts

References

External links
  Kim Hyun Joong discography

2011 EPs
SS501 albums
Warner Music Taiwan EPs